Wetipquin is an unincorporated community in Wicomico County, Maryland, United States.

Long Hill was listed on the National Register of Historic Places in 1974.

References

Unincorporated communities in Wicomico County, Maryland
Unincorporated communities in Maryland
Maryland populated places on the Chesapeake Bay